Mipus tonganus is a species of sea snail, a marine gastropod mollusk in the family Muricidae, the murex snails or rock snails.

Description
The length of the shell attains 11.9 mm.

Distribution
This marine species occurs off Tonga at depths between 281 m and 320 m.

References

tonganus
Gastropods described in 2008